Mark Edward Lenzi (July 4, 1968 – April 9, 2012) was an American Olympic diver and diving coach.  Lenzi was known for his Olympic gold medal in the 1992 Olympic Games, and his Olympic bronze medal in the 1996 Olympic Games on the 3 m springboard.

Lenzi was also the first American diver to perform a 109C (forward 4.5 somersault tuck) in competition, and the first diver to score over 100 points in competition, performing a 307C (reverse 3.5 somersault tuck) off of the 3 m springboard for over 102 points.

Diving career 
Inspired by seeing Greg Louganis earn a gold medal at the 1984 Los Angeles Olympics, Lenzi quit wrestling at age 16 and took up diving.
Lenzi began his collegiate diving career with the Indiana University Hoosiers in 1986.  Lenzi, under the coaching of Hobie Billingsley, won two NCAA Championships in the 1-meter in 1989 and 1990. He was named NCAA Diver of the Year both seasons and added five Big Ten titles to those awards. Of his time at Indiana he said:

After making the U.S. National team in 1989 at age 21, Lenzi graduated from Indiana University and began diving under coach Dick Kimball.  In 1991 and 1992, Lenzi was recognized as the "Phillips 66 Diver of the Year."  Lenzi represented the U.S. at the 1992 Olympics in Barcelona, where he won the gold medal by 31 points over Tan Liangde and Dmitri Sautin.

After briefly retiring from diving shortly after the Olympics, Lenzi returned to the sport in late 1995.  Lenzi qualified for the 1996 Olympic team on the 3m springboard despite an injured shoulder, and won a bronze medal behind Xiong Ni and Yu Zhuocheng.

In total, Lenzi won 18 international competitions at the 1m and 3m springboard level.  He also became the first American diver to perform a 109C in competition, and the first diver to score over 100 points on a single dive in competition. Lenzi returned to Indiana University briefly in the 2000s as an administrative assistant to the swimming and diving program. For the two years prior to his death, Lenzi served as diving coach for the men's and women's teams at East Carolina University.

Personal life 
Mark Lenzi was the son of Ellie and Bill Lenzi and raised in Fredericksburg, Virginia with his three siblings. His decision in high school to switch from wrestling to diving created strife between father and son at first, causing Lenzi to move out of the home for a brief period. However the elder Lenzi became a strong supporter and was even in attendance at the 1992  Barcelona Olympics. After retiring, Lenzi and his wife Dorothy settled in Greenville, North Carolina.

Illness and death 
On March 28, 2012, Lenzi suffered fainting spells, and was taken to Vidant Medical Center in Greenville, North Carolina, where his blood pressure fell to 78/48; normal being 120/80. According to his mother, Lenzi had been taking medication for a heart ailment. He died on April 9, 2012.

See also
 List of members of the International Swimming Hall of Fame

References

External links

1968 births
2012 deaths
Divers at the 1992 Summer Olympics
Divers at the 1996 Summer Olympics
Olympic gold medalists for the United States in diving
Olympic bronze medalists for the United States in diving
Sportspeople from Huntsville, Alabama
American male divers
Medalists at the 1996 Summer Olympics
Medalists at the 1992 Summer Olympics
World Aquatics Championships medalists in diving
Pan American Games gold medalists for the United States
Pan American Games medalists in diving
Divers at the 1991 Pan American Games
Indiana Hoosiers men's divers
Medalists at the 1991 Pan American Games